This list comprises all players who have participated in at least one league match for Greenville Triumph SC since the team's first USL League One season in 2019. Players who were on the roster but never played a first team game are not listed; players who appeared for the team in other competitions (U.S. Open Cup, CONCACAF Champions League, etc.) but never actually made an USL-1 appearance are noted at the bottom of the page.

A "†" denotes a player who appeared in only a single match.

B 
  Christopher Bermudez
  Dominic Boland

C 
  Ryeong Choi
  Paul Clowes

G 
  Carlos Gómez
  Sami Guediri

H 
  Max Hemmings†

J 
  Dallas Jaye

K 
  Jake Keegan

L 
  Evan Lee

M 
  Omar Mohamed

P 
  Tyler Polak
  Kevin Politz

R 
  Edmundo Robinson

S 
  Cameron Saul
  Cole Seiler

W 
  Aaron Walker
  Travis Ward

References 

Greenville Triumph Sc
 
Association football player non-biographical articles